Miroslav Maričić (born 21 January 1998) is a Serbian footballer who plays for Javor Ivanjica.

Career

Javor Ivanjica
Maričić joined the first team of Javor Ivanjica for the 2015–16 season as a scholar and was on the bench for the cup match against Novi Pazar. Previously, he passed all categories of club youth school. He made his senior debut in 35 fixture match of Serbian SuperLiga against Metalac Gornji Milanovac, played on 7 May 2016. Maričić signed four-year scholarship contract with club at the beginning of June 2016. In summer 2017, Maričić signed his first three-year professional contract with the club.

Career statistics

References

External links
 
 

Living people
Sportspeople from Užice
1998 births
Serbian footballers
Association football midfielders
FK Javor Ivanjica players
Serbian SuperLiga players